A Fragment of Irish Annals or Oxford University Collection 103 is an Irish annal, published by Brian Ó Cuív in 1981. The text is believed to date from the years 1467-68 or immediately after and covers only these two years. It is kept at the Bodleian Library, Oxford University, where it is listed as Oxford Univ. Coll. 103.

See also
 Irish annals
 Short Annals of Tirconaill

References
 MS. Oxford Univ. Coll. 103, fols. 53r-56v
 Brian Ó Cuív, A Fragment of Irish Annals. Edited with English translation, In Celtica 14 (1981) pp. 83–104.
 Brian Ó Cuív, "A Fragment of Irish Annals" (translation) in Celtica; 14 (1981) pp. 96–104.

External links
 University College Cork

Irish chronicles
15th-century history books
1467 in Ireland
1468 in Ireland
Texts of medieval Ireland
Irish manuscripts